The Dighton Rock is a 40-ton boulder, originally located in the riverbed of the Taunton River at Berkley, Massachusetts (formerly part of the town of Dighton). The rock is noted for its petroglyphs ("primarily lines, geometric shapes, and schematic drawings of people, along with writing, both verified and not."), carved designs of ancient and uncertain origin, and the controversy about their creators. In 1963, during construction of a coffer dam, state officials removed the rock from the river for preservation. It was installed in a museum in a nearby park, Dighton Rock State Park. In 1971, it was listed on the National Register of Historic Places (NRHP).

Appearance
It is gray-brown crystalline sandstone of medium to coarse texture. The surface with the inscriptions has a trapezoidal face and is inclined 70 degrees to the northwest. It was found facing the water of the bay.

History and mythology
In 1680, the English colonist Rev. John Danforth made a drawing of the petroglyphs, which has been preserved in the British Museum. His drawing conflicts with the reports of others and the current markings on the rock. In 1690 Rev. Cotton Mather described the rock in his book The Wonderful Works of God Commemorated: Among the other Curiosities of New-England, one is that of a mighty Rock, on a perpendicular side whereof by a River, which at High Tide covers part of it, there are very deeply Engraved, no man alive knows How or When about half a score Lines, near Ten Foot Long, and a foot and half broad, filled with strange Characters: which would suggest as odd Thoughts about them that were here before us, as there are odd Shapes in that Elaborate Monument.

During the 19th century, many popular publications and public figures mentioned the rock. The poet and critic James Russell Lowell suggested that presidential candidates' letters to newspapers should be written in its undeciphered script: "[I]f letters must be written, profitable use might be made of the Dighton rock hieroglyphic or the cuneiform script, every fresh decipherer of which is enabled to educe a different meaning." Lowell made other references to the rock in his widely circulated satirical writing, and may thus have helped to popularize it.

Hypotheses about the creation of the markings include:

Indigenous peoples of North America
 …who were known to have inscribed petroglyphs in rocks (a schematic face on the Dighton Rock is similar to an Indian petroglyph in Eastern Vermont)

 Ancient Phoenicians
 …proposed in 1783 by Ezra Stiles in his "Election Sermon" as the "descendants of the sons of Japheth" 

Norse
 …proposed in 1837 by Carl Christian Rafn. Rejected by archaeologists such as T. D. Kendrick and Kenneth Feder.

Portuguese
 …proposed in 1912 by Edmund B. Delabarre, who (after seeing Portuguese writing) believed that they then used the rock for their own inscriptions Delabarre wrote that markings on the Dighton Rock suggest that Miguel Corte-Real reached New England. Delabarre stated that the markings were abbreviated Latin, and the message, translated into English, reads as follows: "I, Miguel Cortereal, 1511. In this place, by the will of God, I became a chief of the Indians." Hunter (2017) provides copious evidence and analysis debunking the Corte-Real origin myth.

Chinese
 …proposed by Gavin Menzies in his 2002 book 1421: The Year China Discovered America

State park

In November 1952, the  Miguel Corte-Real Memorial Society of New York City acquired  of land adjacent to the rock to create a park. However, in 1951 the Massachusetts Legislature expropriated the same land for a State Park. More land was purchased. The vicinity of Dighton Rock has been beautified and furnished with parking and picnic facilities.

Depths of inscriptions
Although Mather described these as deeply cut, a statement which has been repeated to the present day, early reports suggested that this was not exactly the case. DelaBarre wrote:
One thing is certain, that former descriptions of the depth of the incisions cannot be used as evidence for any change. The first who describes them calls them "deeply engraved" in 1690; but Cotton Mather had never seen the rock, so far as we know, and this statement of his is doubtless on a par with his other statement that the characters are on "a mighty Rock." Greenwood gives the first reliable description, in 1730. He definitely says that the "indentures are not very considerable," and his drawing and his other statements prove that he had as much difficulty in making out the real characters as has ever been experienced since then. Even on the lowest part of the face, which alone does show evident signs of much wear, Mather's draughtsman, and Greenwood, and their next followers, were even less successful in making out apparent characters than have been some later observers. Sewall in 1768 and Kendall in 1807 made definite statements to the effect that the greater part of the lines were so much effaced as to make their decipherment impossible, or wholly subject to the fancy.

See also
National Register of Historic Places listings in Bristol County, Massachusetts
Newport Tower (Rhode Island)

Footnotes

Further reading

 Douglas Hunter, The Place of Stone: Dighton Rock and the Erasure of America's Indigenous Past. Chapel Hill, NC: University of North Carolina Press, 2017.

External links

Dighton Rock State Park, Massachusetts Department of Conservation and Recreation
Edward Brecher, "The Enigma of Dighton Rock", American Heritage, June 1958, Volume 9, Issue 4

Landforms of Bristol County, Massachusetts
Pre-Columbian trans-oceanic contact
National Register of Historic Places in Bristol County, Massachusetts
Rock formations of Massachusetts
Petroglyphs in Massachusetts